Vyaz may refer to:
Vyaz (Cyrillic calligraphy), a type of Cyrillic ornate lettering
Vyaz (rural locality), name of several rural localities in Russia